Carphophis vermis (common name western worm snake) is a species of small, nonvenomous colubrid snake native to the United States.

Etymology
The specific name, vermis, is Latin for "worm".

Physical description
Western worm snakes have a dark, black or purplish dorsal coloration, with a lighter, pink or reddish underside.

Geographic range
Western worm snakes are found in the United States in southern Iowa, southeastern Nebraska, eastern Kansas, western Illinois, Missouri, Louisiana, eastern Oklahoma, and northeastern Texas with isolated records from southwestern Wisconsin, southeastern Arkansas and middle Tennessee.

Behavior
Worm snakes are fossorial, and spend the vast majority of time buried in loose, rocky soil, or under damp forest leaf litter. They are abundant within their range, but rarely seen due to their secretive nature.

Reproduction
Little is known about their mating habits, but breeding likely occurs in the early spring. Eggs are laid in the early summer. Clutch size is normally 1-8 eggs, and hatching takes place in August or September.

Diet
The worm snake's diet consists almost entirely of earthworms, but it will also consume soft-bodied insects.

Defense
If harassed, it will often release foul smelling musk from its cloaca. If handled, it may press its tail tip into the captor's hand as a defense mechanism.

References

Further reading
 Behler, J.L., and F.W. King. 1979. The Audubon Society Field Guide to North American Reptiles and Amphibians. Knopf. New York. 743 pp. . (Carphophis amoenus vermis, p. 592 + Plate 493.)
 Kennicott, R. 1859. Notes on Coluber calligaster of Say, and a description of new species of Serpents in the collection of the North Western University of Evanston, Ill[inois]. Proc. Acad. Nat. Sci. Philadelphia [11]: 98–100. (Celuta vermis, pp. 99–100.)

External links

 
 
Western Worm Snake, Reptiles and Amphibians of Iowa

Carphophis
Fauna of the Plains-Midwest (United States)
Fauna of the Southeastern United States
Reptiles of the United States
Taxa named by Robert Kennicott
Reptiles described in 1859